Dichomeris vadonella is a moth in the family Gelechiidae. It was described by Viette in 1955. It is found in Madagascar.

The wingspan is about 17 mm. The forewings are dark brown with a black point. The hindwings are uniform brownish-black.

References

Moths described in 1955
vadonella